James Anson "Kid" McLaughlin (April 12, 1888 – July 12, 1934) was a center fielder in Major League Baseball. Nicknamed "Sunshine", he played for the Cincinnati Reds in 1914.

He was also the head football and baseball coach for St. Bonaventure University.

References

External links 

1888 births
1934 deaths
Baseball players from New York (state)
People from Randolph, New York
Cincinnati Reds players
Colgate Raiders baseball players
Major League Baseball center fielders
Olean Refiners players
Olean White Sox players
St. Bonaventure Bonnies baseball coaches
St. Bonaventure Bonnies baseball players
St. Bonaventure Brown Indians football coaches
St. Bonaventure University faculty